Betiana Blum (born in Charata, Chaco in 1939 as Betty Ana Blum) is an Argentine actress.

Filmography
Esperando la carroza 2: se acabó la fiesta (2009)...Nora
Tocar el cielo (2007)...Gloria
Ciudad en celo (2006)...Marta
Reinas (2005)...Ofelia
El vestido de terciopelo (telefilm - 2001)...Cornelia
El mar de Lucas (1999)...Ana
Esa Maldita Costilla (1999)...Rosa
El secreto de los Andes (1998)
Momentos robados (1997)
Noche de ronda (1997)
Bajo bandera (1997)...Bonavena
Convivencia (1994)
De eso no se habla (1993)
Te amo (1986)...Coca
Sin querer, queriendo (1985)
Esperando la carroza (1985)...Nora
Los insomnes (1984)
Atrapadas (1984)...Martina
Juego perverso (inconclusa - 1984)
Rosa de lejos (1980)
Un toque diferente (1977)
Las turistas quieren guerra (1977)
La noche del hurto (1976)
Los irrompibles (1975)
Un mundo de amor (1975)
Bodas de cristal (1975)
Las procesadas (1975)...Martina
Carmiña (Su historia de amor) (1975)...Elvira
Muñequitas de medianoche (inédita - 1974)
La Sartén por el mango (1972)
Sombras en el cielo (1964)
Soy gitano...Alba

External links

People from Charata
1939 births
Argentine actresses
Living people
Argentine people of German descent